Events from the year 1992 in Algeria

Incumbents
 President – Chadli Bendjedid (until 11 January), then Abdelmalek Benhabyles (until 14 January), then Mohamed Boudiaf (until 29 June), then Ali Kafi
 Prime Minister – Sid Ahmed Ghozali (until 8 July) then Belaid Abdessalam

Events
 4 January – The National People's Assembly is dissolved.
 January – Mohamed Boudiaf invited to become the president of Algeria, backed by the military.
 9 February – Algerian Civil War: State of emergency announced by the government.
 4 March – Islamic Salvation Front banned by the Court of Appeal.
 26 August – A terrorist attack at Houari Boumedienne Airport kills 9 people and injures 128.
 29 June – President Mohamed Boudiaf is assassinated.

Births
25 February – Zahia Dehar, lingerie designer 
 7 May – Abdelmalik Lahoulou, athlete

Deaths
 29 June – Mohamed Boudiaf, politician (born 1919)

References

 
Algeria
Algeria